The 1920 Gonzaga Blue and White football team was an American football team that represented Gonzaga University during the 1920 college football season. In their first year under head coach Gus Dorais, the Blue and White compiled a 4–3 record and outscored their opponents by a total of 164 to 55.

Gus Dorais was hired as Gonzaga's athletic director in May 1920. He had previously served as the head baseball coach at Notre Dame and as an assistant football coach under Knute Rockne. Rockne and Dorais led the 1919 Notre Dame football team to a perfect 9–0 record. As teammates on the undefeated 1913 Notre Dame football team, Dorais and Rockne were credited with popularizing the forward pass.

Schedule

References

Gonzaga
Gonzaga Bulldogs football seasons
Gonzaga Blue and White football